Enallagma truncatum is a species of damselfly in the family Coenagrionidae. It is endemic to Cuba.  Its natural habitats are intermittent freshwater lakes and freshwater marshes. It is threatened by habitat loss.

Sources 

Coenagrionidae
Odonata of North America
Endemic fauna of Cuba
Insects of Cuba
Insects described in 1888
Taxonomy articles created by Polbot